Pachypeza is a genus of beetles in the family Cerambycidae, containing the following species:

 Pachypeza borealis Hovore & Giesbert, 1998
 Pachypeza ferruginea Martins, Galileo & de-Oliveira, 2009
 Pachypeza joda Dillon & Dillon, 1945
 Pachypeza marginata Pascoe, 1888
 Pachypeza panamensis Giesbert, 1987
 Pachypeza pennicornis (Germar, 1824)
 Pachypeza phegea Dillon & Dillon, 1945
 Pachypeza teres Pascoe, 1888

References

Agapanthiini